Chamaesphecia masariformis is a moth of the family Sesiidae. It is found in south-eastern Europe, Turkey, northern Iran, the Middle East, the Caucasus, southern Russia, Uzbekistan and Tajikistan.

The wingspan is 21–23 mm. Adults are on wing from May to July.

The larvae feed on Verbascum species (including Verbascum lychnites, Verbascum thapsus and Verbascum nigrum), Scrophularia canina and possibly Astragalus ponticus.

Subspecies
Chamaesphecia masariformis masariformis
Chamaesphecia masariformis odyneriformis (Herrich-Schäffer, 1846)

References

Moths described in 1808
Sesiidae
Moths of Europe
Moths of Asia